Alejandro Damian da Silva (born 18 May 1983) is a former Paraguayan football striker.

Career

Club career
Da Silva started his career with Cerro Porteño before moving to Italy where he played for Udinese, Foggia and Sambenedettese. In 2000 it was discovered that he had entered Italy using a forged passport and banned in July 2001.

In 2005, Da Silva returned to Paraguay to rejoin Cerro Porteño where he played until his transfer to Newell's Old Boys in 2007.

He represented Paraguay U17 at the 1999 FIFA U-17 World Championship.

Da Silva made his debut for the Paraguay national football team in 2007.

References

External links

1983 births
Living people
Paraguayan footballers
Paraguay international footballers
Paraguay under-20 international footballers
Paraguayan expatriate footballers
Association football forwards
Cerro Porteño players
Udinese Calcio players
Calcio Foggia 1920 players
A.S. Sambenedettese players
Newell's Old Boys footballers
Santiago Wanderers footballers
The Strongest players
Club Rubio Ñu footballers
Paraguayan Primera División players
Bolivian Primera División players
Serie A players
Chilean Primera División players
Argentine Primera División players
Paraguayan expatriate sportspeople in Italy
Paraguayan expatriate sportspeople in Chile
Paraguayan expatriate sportspeople in Argentina
Paraguayan expatriate sportspeople in Bolivia
Expatriate footballers in Italy
Expatriate footballers in Chile
Expatriate footballers in Argentina
Expatriate footballers in Bolivia